Challand-Saint-Anselme (Issime );  is a town and comune in the Aosta Valley region of northwestern Italy.

Main sights
 Church of Saint-Anselme
 Shrine of Sainte Anne

People
Bianca Maria, the Countess of Challant was executed for adultery on 20 October 1526, becoming the prototype for many literary works. An account of Bianca Maria's life and death was included by Matteo Bandello in his 1554 Novelle collection. François de Belleforest translated Bandello's account into French in 1565, which in turn appeared in English as the 24th story in William Painter's Palace of Pleasure (1567). Early Jacobean English dramatist John Marston employed the lady as the title character of his tragedy The Insatiate Countess, first published in 1613.

References

Cities and towns in Aosta Valley